Halifax railway station serves the town of Halifax in West Yorkshire, England.

The two routes divide about a mile south of the station at Dryclough Junction.

To the east, the line also divided with the current line passing into Beacon Hill tunnel and a disused line via Halifax North Bridge to Ovenden, then going on to a junction at Holmfield with the Halifax High level line which had stations in Pellon and at St Paul's, Queens Road; and via  to Bradford and Keighley, for destinations in the North-West.

Description 

The station has a car park, bicycle parking and a pick up point, like many other stations. There is also a staffed ticket booth with option of paying for a ticket using a ticket machine. A lift to the platform is available for wheelchair users, but there are currently no lower counters for easier access to buy tickets.

Entry to the station is via a cobbled road bridge from opposite the bottom of Horton Street.

History 

With the opening of the line between Halifax and Bradford on 7 August 1850, a new station was opened on the current site; this had temporary wooden buildings. The station at Shaw Syke was then extended and used as a goods depot The permanent buildings at the current site were designed by Thomas Butterworth and opened on 23 June 1855. This Grade II listed building housed the nursery associated with the Eureka! Children's Museum until its closure on 18 December 2020.

A new line was constructed by the Great Northern Railway in the mid-1870s from the main station over a long viaduct to a station at North Bridge, then across and indeed partly in tunnel beneath the hilly terrain north of the town to an unusual triangular station at Queensbury, where the line divided into track for Keighley (and Skipton, Carlisle and Morecambe) to the north-west and Bradford in the east.

Halifax station was redesigned during 1884–85 and completely rebuilt during 1885–86. Part of the new station opened on 25 October 1885 and the remainder on 30 May 1886. The new station had separate accommodation for LYR and GNR trains; the latter being on the west side.

To distinguish it from Halifax St. Paul's and Halifax North Bridge stations, the main station was known from June 1890 as Halifax Old Station. On 30 September 1951, the name was changed again to Halifax Town and, on 12 June 1961, it reverted to Halifax.

The Halifax High Level Railway was a related branch line opened in 1890, leading from Holmfield near Ovenden, on the line to Queensbury, through a half-mile tunnel through the ridge and across the Wheatley Valley on a ten arch viaduct past Samuel Webster's brewery, to Pellon, where there were sizeable goods facilities and then to St Paul's railway station in Queens Road. This branch line gradually fell into disuse, losing its regular passenger service as early as 1917. The last goods train ran in 1960 and the line was then dismantled, leaving the viaduct standing as a reminder of the former freight link.

The Queensbury branch as a whole was closed in stages from 1955 onwards, although many of its engineering features remain. The route has lately been adopted and to an extent brought back into public use and attention by Sustrans as a walking and cycle route. It is currently derelict, partially flooded and impassible, although a campaign is  underway to save it for inclusion in the Sustrans route.

A campaign, run by the local newspaper the Halifax Evening Courier, was started to get the station refurbished. The paper said that it wanted a station fit "for the 21st century" and that its current state was "disgraceful". Due to the amount of support generated, Network Rail and Northern agreed to do so.

Work began in May 2009 on a £2.5 million refurbishment scheme that has seen the station footbridge and canopies repaired, new glazing and lighting installed and repainting of the structures. The second phase of the refurbishment, covering the platform and the concourse, was completed in November 2010.

In October 2014, plans were submitted to bring an old platform back into use to create three platforms together with signalling improvements.  Network Rail subsequently announced plans to upgrade the eastern portion of the Calder Valley line in 2017, which will see the surviving signal box here closed.  Control of the upgraded track layout and new signalling was passed to the York Rail Operating Centre in October 2018.

Services 

Eastbound: Monday to Saturdays there are now five departures per hour to Bradford, of which four continue to Leeds (the ex-Huddersfield service terminates at Bradford). Fewer trains run in the evening.

One of the two Manchester trains is limited stop (calling only at Hebden Bridge, Todmorden and Rochdale), whilst the other calls at all intermediate stations to Todmorden, then fast to Rochdale & Manchester. The latter now runs through to  via . One service per hour from the Leeds direction terminates here.

On Sundays there is an hourly service to each of Manchester Victoria, Blackpool North and to Huddersfield.

The Chester service began running at the May 2019 timetable change. Further alterations at the December 2019 change will see the Huddersfield service start/terminate at Bradford, but a new service to  via  introduced to maintain the frequency for through trains to Leeds and restore through service to stations east of there.

London services 
The station now sees regular services to London King's Cross via Wakefield Kirkgate, Pontefract and Doncaster. In January 2009, Grand Central had their application for train paths to run a Bradford Interchange to London service accepted by the Office of Rail Regulation. Three trains per day initially operated once full approval for the service was granted  - these use Class 180 units and started running from 23 May 2010.  A fourth service to and from London commenced in December 2013

See also
Listed buildings in Halifax, West Yorkshire

References

External links

Railway stations in Calderdale
DfT Category C2 stations
Former Lancashire and Yorkshire Railway stations
Railway stations in Great Britain opened in 1844
Railway stations in Great Britain closed in 1850
Railway stations in Great Britain opened in 1850
Railway stations served by Grand Central Railway
Northern franchise railway stations
Buildings and structures in Halifax, West Yorkshire